Alan Rich (June 17, 1924 – April 23, 2010) was an American music critic who served on the staff of many newspapers and magazines on both coasts. Originally from Brookline, Massachusetts, he first studied medicine at Harvard University before turning to music. While a student at Harvard he began his career as critic, working as assistant music critic at the Boston Herald.

He was music director of KPFA, the Berkeley radio station, and successively a music critic for publications including The New York Times, the New York Herald Tribune, New York magazine, Newsweek, California magazine, the Los Angeles Herald-Examiner, Opera News, and from 1992 to 2008 LA Weekly magazine. He subsequently worked briefly as music critic for Bloomberg News.

Rich also wrote a number of books including Music, Mirror of the Arts (1969) and So I've Heard: Notes of a Migratory Music Critic, published in 2006.

In 1990, Rich authored an innovative CD-ROM exploring Schubert's "Trout Quintet". Published by The Voyager Company, and produced by composer David Javelosa.

References

Further reading

External links 
 Alan Rich's website
 Alan Rich Obituary, Guardian [London]

1924 births
2010 deaths
Harvard Medical School alumni
American music critics
American music journalists
Classical music critics
Writers from Los Angeles
Writers from Brookline, Massachusetts
The New York Times writers
New York Herald Tribune people
New York (magazine) people
Newsweek people